The thread eel (Serrivomer bertini, also known as the thread sawtooth eel) is an eel in the family Nemichthyidae (snipe eels). It was described by Marie-Louise Bauchot in 1959. It is a marine, temperate water-dwelling eel which is known from the Indo-Pacific and Chile in the southwestern Pacific Ocean.

Etymology
The fish is named in honor of Léon Bertin (1896-1954), of the Muséum national d’histoire naturelle in Paris. Bauchot served as an assistant to him in 1952.

References

Nemichthyidae
Taxa named by Marie-Louise Bauchot
Fish described in 1959